Stewardess is a 1967 Soviet black-and-white short romance film. The plot is centered on a stewardess Olga servicing a domestic flight. The story reveals that she is in love with a geologist and became a stewardess to have an opportunity to meet him occasionally on a remote Siberian airfield.

The film won two special jury awards at the Golden Prague International Television Festival in 1968 and 1969.

Cast
 Alla Demidova as Olga Ivanovna 
 Georgiy Zhzhonov as passenger-screenwriter
 Vladimir Etush as Caucasian passenger
 Ivan Ryzhov as   passenger with children's toys
 Valentina Vladimirova as scandalous passenger
 Yevgeniy Yevstigneyev as drunk passenger

References

External links
 Stewardess at the KinoPoisk

1967 romantic drama films
Soviet black-and-white films
Films set on airplanes
Soviet romantic drama films
Soviet short films
Films based on works by Yuri Nagibin
Russian romantic drama films
Mosfilm films
1967 films
1967 short films
Russian black-and-white films
Russian short films
Films about flight attendants
1960s Russian-language films